Combe St Nicholas is a village and parish in Somerset, England, situated  northwest of Chard and  from Taunton in the South Somerset district on the edge of the Blackdown Hills Area of Outstanding Natural Beauty.  The parish, which includes Wadeford and Scrapton, has a population of 1,373.

History

There are also the remains of a Roman Villa in the town known as Wadeford Roman villa which is scheduled as an ancient monument.

At the time of the Domesday Book the manor was held by Bishop Gisa. The parish was known as Combe Episcopi until the dedication of the church to St Nicholas in 1239.

Governance

The parish council has responsibility for local issues, including setting an annual precept (local rate) to cover the council's operating costs and producing annual accounts for public scrutiny. The parish council evaluates planning applications and works with the police, district council officers, and neighbourhood watch groups on matters of crime, security, and traffic. The parish council's role also includes initiating projects for the maintenance and repair of parish facilities, as well as consulting with the district council on the maintenance, repair, and improvement of highways, drainage, footpaths, public transport, and street cleaning. Conservation matters (including trees and listed buildings) and environmental issues are also the responsibility of the council.

The village falls within the Non-metropolitan district of South Somerset, which was formed on 1 April 1974 under the Local Government Act 1972, having previously been part of Chard Rural District. The district council is responsible for local planning and building control, roads, council housing, environmental health, markets and fairs, refuse collection and recycling, cemeteries and crematoria, leisure services, parks, and tourism.

Somerset County Council is responsible for running the largest and most expensive local services such as education, social services, libraries, main roads, public transport, policing and fire services, trading standards, waste disposal and strategic planning.

The village falls within the 'Blackdown' electoral ward. This ward stretches north west to Buckland St Mary and south to Wambrook. The total ward population at the 2011 Census was 2,334.

It is also part of the Yeovil county constituency represented in the House of Commons of the Parliament of the United Kingdom. It elects one Member of Parliament (MP) by the first-past-the-post system of election, and was part of the South West England constituency of the European Parliament prior to Britain leaving the European Union in January 2020, which elected seven MEPs using the d'Hondt method of party-list proportional representation.

Geography

To the east of the village is Woolhayes Farm, a biological Site of Special Scientific Interest.

The source of the River Isle is at Scrapton.

Religious sites

The Church of St Nicholas is Norman in origin, with the chancel and lower stage of the tower dating from the 13th century. It was enlarged with aisles added in the 15th century, and received further restoration in 1836. It has been designated by English Heritage as a grade 1 listed building.

References

External links

Combe St Nicholas Parish Web site

Villages in South Somerset
Civil parishes in Somerset